is a Japanese-language monthly magazine for railfans covering the mainly Japanese railways published by Koyusha. It has been published in Japan since 1961. Issues go on sale on the 21st of each month, two months before the cover month (e.g. the March issue is on sale on the 21st of January). Each copy sells for between ¥1,100 and ¥1,200 depending on the number of pages. The magazine reports on railway prototypes, complete with technical plans, photos, maps, graphs, and tables.

See also 
 List of railroad-related periodicals

External links 
  

1961 establishments in Japan
Magazines published in Japan
Monthly magazines published in Japan
Magazines established in 1961
Railway culture in Japan
Rail transport magazines